The 2018 Frisco Bowl was a college football bowl game played on December 19, 2018, with kickoff scheduled for 8:00 p.m. EST (7:00 p.m. local CST). It was the second edition of the Frisco Bowl, and one of the 2018–19 bowl games concluding the 2018 FBS football season. Sponsored by Destination XL Group, a retailer of men's big and tall apparel, the game was officially known as the DXL Frisco Bowl. In the game, the Ohio Bobcats shut out the San Diego State Aztecs, 27–0.

Teams
Although the bowl has a tie-in with the American Athletic Conference, due to UCF receiving a bid to the Fiesta Bowl—a New Year's Six bowl—the conference was unable to provide a team. Thus, bowl organizers sought at-large teams, and announced a matchup of the Ohio Bobcats of the Mid-American Conference (MAC) against the San Diego State Aztecs of the Mountain West Conference. This was the first meeting between the two programs.

Ohio Bobcats

Ohio received and accepted a bid to the Frisco Bowl on December 2. The Bobcats entered the bowl with an 8–4 record (6–2 in conference), having won 5-of-6 to close their regular season.

San Diego State Aztecs

San Diego State received and accepted a bid to the Frisco Bowl on December 2. The Aztecs entered the bowl with a 7–5 record (4–4 in conference), having lost 4-of-5 to close their regular season.

Game summary

Scoring summary

Statistics

References

Further reading

External links

Box score at ESPN

Frisco Bowl
Frisco Bowl
Frisco Bowl
Frisco Bowl
Ohio Bobcats football bowl games
San Diego State Aztecs football bowl games